The 1974–75 Essex Senior Football League season was the fourth in the history of Essex Senior Football League, a football competition in England.

League table

The league featured nine clubs which competed in the league last season, along with six new clubs:
Bowers United, joined from the Essex Olympian League
Brentwood Athletic, joined from the Essex Olympian League, renaming themselves Brentwood
Colchester United 'A'
Ford United, joined from the Metropolitan–London League
Romford reserves
Southend United 'A'

League table

References

Essex Senior Football League seasons
1974–75 in English football leagues